CO Roubaix-Tourcoing won Division 1 season 1946/1947 of the French Association Football League with 53 points.

Participating teams

 Bordeaux
 AS Cannes
 Le Havre AC
 RC Lens
 Lille OSC
 Olympique de Marseille
 FC Metz
 SO Montpellier
 FC Nancy
 RC Paris
 Red Star Olympique
 Stade de Reims
 Stade Rennais UC
 CO Roubaix-Tourcoing
 FC Rouen
 AS Saint-Étienne
 FC Sète
 Stade Français FC
 RC Strasbourg
 Toulouse FC

Final table

Promoted from Division 2, who will play in Division 1 season 1947/1948
 FC Sochaux-Montbéliard: Champion of Division 2
 Olympique Alès: Runner-up

Results

Top goalscorers

References
 Division 1 season 1946-1947 at pari-et-gagne.com

Ligue 1 seasons
French
1